The following is a list of presidents of Union Cycliste Internationale (UCI), the world cycling governing body.

References 

 
Presidents of the UCI
UCI